George Lebese (born 3 February 1989) is a South African international footballer who plays as a left winger.

Club career
Born in Mamelodi, Lebese spent his early career with Jusben, Khona Lapho and Arcadia Shepherds. Lebese joined Kaizer Chiefs ahead of the 2008–09 season. He signed for Mamelodi Sundowns in August 2017. He spent time on loan at Supersport United before being released in September 2019. He moved to American side Colorado Springs Switchbacks for the 2020 season. In March 2021 it was announced that Lebese had left Colorado by mutual consent following the implementation of a COVID-19 related travel ban in the United States, which prevented him from travelling from South Africa.

International career
He received his first call-up to the South African national team in November 2011, making his international debut against Ivory Coast on 11 November 2011.

References

External links

1989 births
Living people
People from Mamelodi
South African soccer players
South Africa international soccer players
Arcadia Shepherds F.C. players
Kaizer Chiefs F.C. players
South African Premier Division players
Association football wingers
Mamelodi Sundowns F.C. players
SuperSport United F.C. players
Colorado Springs Switchbacks FC players
South African expatriate soccer players
South African expatriates in the United States
Expatriate soccer players in the United States
Sportspeople from Gauteng
USL Championship players